Calgary/Christiansen Field Aerodrome  is a private airport located  northwest of Okotoks, Alberta, Canada. It is owned by Soren Christiansen.

See also
List of airports in the Calgary area

References

Registered aerodromes in Alberta